Bishnupur Katti  is a Village Development Committee in Siraha District in the Sagarmatha Zone of south-eastern Nepal. At the time of the 2011 Nepal census it had a population of 11554 people residing in 2185 individual households.

References

External links
UN map of the municipalities of  Siraha District

Populated places in Siraha District